David Faber may refer to:

David Faber (printmaker) (born 1950), American printmaker
David Faber (politician) (born 1961), English schoolmaster, formerly a Conservative politician
David Faber (CNBC) (born 1964), host on CNBC's Squawk on the Street
David Faber (author) (1926–2015), Holocaust survivor and author of Because of Romek
David A. Faber (born 1942), U.S. district judge